Ivana Rašić Trmčić (born on 12 October 1981), better known as Sajsi MC, is a Serbian rapper and songwriter. Recognized as one of the most prominent female rappers in Serbia, her lyrics explore sexuality, feminism and other socio-political subjects.

Early life
Rašić was born in Belgrade on 12 October 1981 and grew up in the city's downtown municipality Vračar. Her father, Jovan Rašić, is a dentist who was also the founder and lead singer of the popular Yugoslavian jazz rock band Generacija 5. She has a younger sister Tijana, professionally known as Tijara, who often collaborates with Sajsi. 

Sajsi MC stated that unlike her sister she did not show interest in music during childhood, but only during her university years that she started writing lyrics.

Career
Rašić debuted at a rap festival in the Belgrade night club Barutana in 2002. Initially, Sajsi MC was a collective, which existed between 2005 and 2009. The name of their act is Šatrovački for oral sex. In 2010, Sajsi pursued a solo career under the same stage name by releasing her album Daleko je Dizni under Multimedia Music. The following year, she saw widespread mainstream attention after she had released the song "Mama" featuring Damjan Eltech in May 2011. The made-up character of a "shallow and materialistic" high school girl named Tiffany, which was portrayed by Sajsi in the song, was negatively commented by musical critics on Radio Television of Serbia, failing to recognize the satire behind it.

Sajsi MC has released three solo albums - Daleko je Dizni (2010), Rad, rad i samo bleja (2018) and Kardinalna (2022), and three EPs - KNVK (2012), Pokvarenica (2014) and IVANARASHIC (2023). Some of her best-known songs include: "Antifa kučke" (2012), "Nadrkano hodanje" (2014), "Došla sam da dam" (2015), "Lokal beogradizam" (2016) and "Redaljka" (2017). She also collaborated with Croatian singer Severina on their duet "Silikoni", released in July 2016.

Over the years, Sajsi MC has performed at larger regional music festivals such as EXIT, Sea Dance Festival, Belgrade Beer Fest, Arsenal Fest and Guča Trumpet Festival.

Public image
Recognized as an ally to the LGBT+ community in Serbia, she was announced as the "godmother" of the 2022 Belgrade Pride, which was also the host of that year's EuroPride event.

In October 2022, she was also featured in an UN Women campaign against gender-based violence in Serbia.

Personal life
In 2017, she graduated from the Faculty of Political Sciences, University of Belgrade with a bachelor's degree in international relations. In August 2021, Rašić married punk musician Marko Trmčić. On 25 January 2023, during the Music Awards Ceremony, she revealed her pregnancy. On March 12, Rašić gave birth to a daughter named Nataša.

Discography
Studio albums
Misi nači naaš (2009); as Sajsi MC band
Daleko je Dizni (2010)
Od dvanaest do šest (2012); feat. Damjan Eltech
Rad, rad i samo bleja (2018)
Kardinalna (2022)

EPs
KNVK (2012)
Pokvarenica (2014)
 IVANARASHIC (2023)

Awards and nominations

References

External links
 

Living people
1981 births
Singers from Belgrade
21st-century Serbian women singers
Serbian rappers